Greenville Airport may refer to:

 Greenville Airport (Illinois) in Greenville, Illinois, United States (FAA/IATA: GRE)
 Greenville Downtown Airport in Greenville, South Carolina, United States (FAA/IATA: GMU)
 Greenville Municipal Airport (Maine) in Greenville, Maine, United States (FAA: 3B1)
 Greenville Municipal Airport (Michigan) in Greenville, Michigan, United States (FAA: 6D6)
 Greenville Municipal Airport (Pennsylvania) in Greenville, Pennsylvania, United States (FAA: 4G1)
 Greenville-Rainbow Airport in Greenville, New York, United States (FAA: 1H4)
 Greenville Spartanburg International Airport in Greer, South Carolina, United States (FAA/IATA: GSP)
 Mid Delta Regional Airport in Greenville, Mississippi, United States (FAA/IATA: GLH)
 Pitt-Greenville Airport in Greenville, North Carolina, United States (FAA/IATA: PGV)

See also
Greenville Municipal Airport (disambiguation)